Caires is a civil parish in the municipality of Amares, Braga District, Portugal. The population in 2011 was 868, in an area of 4.72 km².

References

Freguesias of Amares